Zinc finger protein Eos is a protein that in humans is encoded by the IKZF4 gene.

Members of the Ikaros (ZNFN1A1; MIM 603023) family of transcription factors, which includes Eos, are expressed in lymphocytes and are implicated in the control of lymphoid development.[supplied by OMIM]

Interactions
IKZF4 has been shown to interact with CTBP1 and IKZF1.

References

Further reading